The Ommatolampidinae are a subfamily of grasshoppers in the family Acrididae, found in central and South America, and based on the type genus Ommatolampis.  Derived from the "Ommatolampides" used by Brunner von Wattenwyl in 1893, the first use of the name in its current form was by Rodríguez et al. in 2013; this taxon appears to be paraphyletic.

Tribes and genera
The Orthoptera Species File lists seven tribes and currently includes over 115 genera:

Abracrini
Authority: Amédégnato, 1974

 Abracris Walker, 1870
 Agesander Stål, 1878
 Arimacris Matiotti da Costa & Silva Carvalho, 2006
 Caruaruacris Matiotti da Costa & Silva Carvalho, 2006
 Eujivarus Bruner, 1911
 Eusitalces Bruner, 1911
 Ixalotettix Amédégnato & Descamps, 1979
 Jodacris Giglio-Tos, 1897
 Liebermannacris Matiotti da Costa & Silva Carvalho, 2006
 Monneacris Amédégnato & Descamps, 1979
 Omalotettix Bruner, 1906
 Orthoscapheus Bruner, 1906
 Parasitalces Bruner, 1911
 Psiloscirtus Bruner, 1911
 Rhachicreagra Rehn, 1905
 Robustusacris Matiotti da Costa & Silva Carvalho, 2006
 Roppacris Amédégnato & Descamps, 1979
 Salvadoracris Matiotti da Costa & Silva Carvalho, 2006
 Sitalces (grasshopper) Stål, 1878
 Teinophaus Bruner, 1908
 Xiphiola Bolívar, 1896

Aspidophymini
Authority: Bolívar, 1884
 Aspidophyma Bolívar, 1884
 Loepacris Descamps & Amédégnato, 1973
 Malezacris Amédégnato & Poulain, 1998
 Thamnacris Descamps & Amédégnato, 1972

Clematodinini
Authority: Amédégnato, 1974
 Clematodina Günther, 1940
 Rehnuciera Carbonell, 1969

Ommatolampidini
Authority: Brunner von Wattenwyl, 1893

subtribe Ommatolampina Brunner von Wattenwyl, 1893
 Dicaearchus (grasshopper) Stål, 1878
 Episomacris Carbonell & Descamps, 1978
 Eucosmetacris Carbonell & Descamps, 1978
 Eulampiacris Carbonell & Descamps, 1978
 Hippariacris Carbonell & Descamps, 1978
 Kyphiacris Carbonell & Descamps, 1978
 Lamiacris Carbonell & Descamps, 1978
 Leptopteracris Carbonell & Descamps, 1978
 Muriciacris Matiotti da Costa, 2014
 Nepiopteracris Carbonell & Descamps, 1978
 Ommatolampis Burmeister, 1838
 Peruana Koçak & Kemal, 2008
 Ronderosacris Carbonell & Descamps, 1978
 Stenelutracris Carbonell & Descamps, 1978
 Tingomariacris Carbonell & Descamps, 1978
subtribe Oulenotacrina Amédégnato, 1977
 Agrotacris Descamps, 1979
 Anablysis Gerstaecker, 1889
 Ananotacris Descamps, 1978
 Antiphanes (grasshopper) Stål, 1878
 Barypygiacris Descamps, 1979
 Demochares (grasshopper) Bolívar, 1906
 Eurybiacris Descamps, 1979
 Hysterotettix Descamps, 1979
 Odontonotacris Descamps, 1978
 Pseudhypsipages Descamps, 1977
subtribe Vilernina Brunner von Wattenwyl, 1893
 genus group Nicarchae Brunner von Wattenwyl, 1893
 Acridocryptus Descamps, 1976
 Aptoceras Bruner, 1908
 Bryophilacris Descamps, 1976
 Cryptacris Descamps & Rowell, 1984
 Hypsipages Gerstaecker, 1889
 Nicarchus (grasshopper) Stål, 1878
 Rhabdophilacris Descamps, 1976
 Sciaphilacris Descamps, 1976
 Sclerophilacris Descamps, 1976
 other genera
 Agenacris Amédégnato & Descamps, 1979
 Caletes (grasshopper) Redtenbacher, 1892
 Carbonelliella Cadena-Castañeda & Cardona, 2015
 Leptomerinthoprora Rehn, 1905
 Leticiacris Amédégnato & Descamps, 1978
 Locheuma Scudder, 1897
 Lysacris Descamps & Amédégnato, 1972
 Machaeropoles Rehn, 1909
 Pseudovilerna Descamps & Amédégnato, 1989
 Reyesacris Fontana, Buzzetti & Mariño-Pérez, 2011
 Sciponacris Descamps, 1978
 Vilerna Stål, 1873

Pauracrini
Authority: Amédégnato, 1974
 Christenacris Descamps & Rowell, 1984
 Pauracris Descamps & Amédégnato, 1972

Pycnosarcini
Authority: Liebermann, 1951
 Apoxycephalacris Amédégnato & Descamps, 1978
 Pycnosarcus Bolívar, 1906

Syntomacrini
Authority: Amédégnato, 1974

subtribe Caloscirtina Descamps, 1977
 Adelacris Descamps & Amédégnato, 1972
 Anoptotettix Amédégnato & Descamps, 1979
 Ateliacris Descamps & Rowell, 1978
 Beoscirtacris Descamps, 1977
 Calohippus Descamps, 1978
 Caloscirtus Bruner, 1911
 Eugenacris Descamps & Amédégnato, 1972
 Hylescirtacris Descamps, 1978
 Machigengacris Descamps, 1977
 Miacris Descamps, 1981
 Microtylopteryx Rehn, 1905
 Ociotettix Amédégnato & Descamps, 1979
 Ortalacris Descamps & Amédégnato, 1972
 Oteroa Amédégnato & Descamps, 1979
 Oyampiacris Descamps, 1977
 Pseudanniceris Descamps, 1977
 Stigacris Descamps, 1977
subtribe Syntomacrina Amédégnato, 1974
 Amblyxypha Uvarov, 1925
 Anniceris (grasshopper) Stål, 1878
 Deinacris Amédégnato & Descamps, 1979
 Osmiliola Giglio-Tos, 1897
 Phaulacris Amédégnato & Descamps, 1979
 Pollostacris Amédégnato & Descamps, 1979
 Pseudococama Descamps & Amédégnato, 1971
 Rhabdoscirtus Bruner, 1911
 Rhopsotettix Amédégnato & Descamps, 1979
 Rhyphoscirtus Amédégnato & Descamps, 1979
 Seabracris Amédégnato & Descamps, 1979
 Syntomacrella Descamps, 1978
 Syntomacris Walker, 1870
 Xiphidiopteron Bruner,

Incertae sedis
 Acridurus Perez-Gelabert, Dominici, Hierro & Otte, 1995
 Beckeracris Amédégnato & Descamps, 1979
 Guajirus Perez-Gelabert, 2020
 Hispanacris Perez-Gelabert, Dominici, Hierro & Otte, 1995
 Hispanotettix Perez-Gelabert, Dominici, Hierro & Otte, 1995
 Lagidacris Amédégnato & Descamps, 1979
 Tergoceracris Perez-Gelabert & Otte, 2003

References

External links 
 
 

Orthoptera subfamilies
Acrididae
Orthoptera of South America